The 1991 Virginia Slims of Nashville was a women's tennis tournament played on indoor hard courts at the Maryland Farms Racquet Club in Brentwood, Tennessee in the United States and was part of Tier IV of the 1991 WTA Tour. It was the sixth and last edition of the tournament and ran from November 4 through November 10, 1991. Fourth-seeded Sabine Appelmans won the singles title and earned $27,000 first-prize money.

Finals

Singles

 Sabine Appelmans defeated  Katrina Adams 6–2, 6–4
 It was Appelmans' 2nd singles title of the year and of her career.

Doubles

 Sandy Collins /  Elna Reinach defeated  Yayuk Basuki /  Caroline Vis 5–7, 6–4, 7–6(9–7)

References

External links
 ITF tournament edition details
 Tournament draws

Virginia Slims of Nashville
Virginia Slims of Nashville
Virginia Slims of Nashville
Virginia Slims of Nashville
Virginia Slims of Nashville